Loui Nelum Sandamali Sand (born Louise Sand; 27 December 1992 in Modara, Sri Lanka), is a Swedish handball player. In January 2019, Sand announced his retirement from handball due to gender dysphoria. 

Sand was adopted from Sri Lanka by a Swedish couple and raised in Gothenburg.

In 2021 he made a comeback in handball, as he signed a contract with the Swedish Kärra HF's men's team, becoming the first trans professional handball player in Sweden.

Achievements  
Carpathian Trophy (women's handball):
Winner: 2015

References

External links

1992 births
Living people
Swedish male handball players
Handball players from Gothenburg
Handball players at the 2016 Summer Olympics
Olympic handball players of Sweden
IK Sävehof players
Expatriate handball players
Swedish expatriate sportspeople in France
Swedish people of Sri Lankan descent
Transgender sportsmen
Swedish LGBT sportspeople
LGBT handball players